At The End Of The Day is the first full-length LP by Malaysia-based band Disagree. It was released on February 10, 2004.

Track listing

Personnel
Zahid – Vocals, Lead Guitar
Hamka – Drums
Aziz – Bass
Ashroff – Rhythm Guitar

References

 Article on the debut album 'At The End Of The Day'..

2004 debut albums
Disagree (band) albums